The International Association for Computing and Philosophy (IACAP) is a professional, philosophical association emerging from a history of conferences that began in 1986. Adopting its mission from these conferences, the IACAP exists in order to promote scholarly dialogue on all aspects of the computational/informational turn and the use of computers in the service of philosophy.

The role of the IACAP is to help facilitate a global communications network for those interested in computing and philosophy as defined by these themes. To this end, it sponsors a series of international conferences and this developing website.

The IACAP maintains a friendship with the American Philosophical Association through the liaison of the APA's Committee on Philosophy and Computers. It is currently based at Carnegie Mellon University in Pittsburgh, Pennsylvania, The United States of America (United States).

Awards
IACAP hands out two awards at their yearly meetings: The Covey Award and The Herbert A. Simon Award.

The Covey Award
 2022: Shannon Vallor (University of Edinburgh)
 2021: Helen Nissenbaum (Cornell Tech)
 2020: No award
 2019: John Weckert (Charles Sturt University)
 2018: Deborah G. Johnson (University of Virginia)
 2017: Raymond Turner (University of Essex)
 2016: Jack Copeland (University of Canterbury, New Zealand)
 2015: William J. Rapaport (University at Buffalo, The State University of New York)
 2014: Selmer Bringsjord (Rensselaer Polytechnic Institute)
 2013: Margaret Boden (University of Sussex)
 2012: Luciano Floridi (University of Hertfordshire)
 2011: Terrell Bynum (Southern Connecticut State University)
 2010: John R. Searle (University of California, Berkeley)
 2009: Edward N. Zalta (Stanford University)

The Herbert A. Simon Award

 2022: Björn Lundgren (Utrecht University)
 2021: Carissa Véliz (University of Oxford)
 2020: No award
 2019: Juan M. Durán (Delft University of Technology)
 2018: Thomas C. King (Oxford Internet Institute)
 2017: Andrea Scarantino (Georgia State University)
 2016: Marcin Milkowski (The Institute of Philosophy and Sociology of the Polish Academy of Sciences)
 2015: Michael Rescorla (University of California-Santa Barbara)
 2014: Gualterio Piccinini (U Missouri- St. Louis)
 2013: Judith Simon (University of Vienna)
 2012: Patrick Allo (Vrije Universiteit Brussels)
 2011: John Sullins (Sonoma State)
 2010: Mariarosaria Taddeo (University of Hertfordshire; University of Oxford)

Presidents
 Steven T McKinlay 2022 - 
 Don Berkich 2016-2022
 Mariarosaria Taddeo 2013-2016
Anthony Beavers 2011-2013
Luciano Floridi 2006-2011
Jon Dorbolo 2003-2006
Robert Cavalier, founder

Research and teaching areas
IACAP research and teaching areas include:
Artificial intelligence / cognitive science
Artificial life / computer modeling in biology
Computer ethics / information ethics
Computer-mediated communication
Culture and society
Digital physics
Distance education and electronic pedagogy
Electronic publishing
Logic and logic software
Metaphysics (distributed processing, emergent properties, formal ontology, network structures, etc.)
Online resources for philosophy
Philosophy of information
Philosophy of technology
Robotics
Virtual reality

See also
Barwise prize

References

External links 
Official Website
Covey Award
Goldberg Award

International professional associations
Information technology organizations
Philosophical societies